A Game of Tric-Trac is a painting by Judith Leyster from 1630.

Description 
A Game of Tric-Trac offers an insight into seventeenth century Dutch nightlife as well as the codes surrounding prostitution and morality. Backgammon, which was commonly called tric-trac, was a popular pastime during Leyster's lifetime, depicted in paintings by many of her contemporaries. While there is often a woman present in these pieces, besides one print by Jacob Matham, none of them depict her as having an active role in the game. Leyster's painting is interesting then because the woman in it appears to the opposing player. Leyster signals this to the viewer with her placement of the oil lamp, which would have been placed on one side of the board (the "inner table") between the two players.

Role of Prostitution 
Compared to other paintings and prints of her time, such as A Game of Tric-Trac in an Inn by Remigius Hogenberg, Leyster's identification of the woman in her painting as a prostitute is not as obvious. While she holds a glass of wine (a symbol which may have codified her profession) her clothing is more modest and domestic.  It is, however, the lit pipe which she hands to her opposer which gives away her occupation. During Leyster's life time pijpen or "to pipe/to smoke a pipe" would have had explicit sexual connotations. A similar idea is found in Jacob Cats' Spiegel van den Ouwden en Niewen in the section "Whores and their sly tricks" which depicts a prostitute handing her client a brazier of hot coals instead of a pipe. However both Leyster's painting and the emblem in Cats' book can be read through its accompanying verse "Thus I am in danger where I put my fingers; your coal as does your maidenhead - it burns or it infects" condemning both the courtesan and her male client. Some critics, such as Cynthia Kartnehorst-Von Borgendorf Rupprath argue that Leyster's work drives this point home as the man in the painting breaks the fourth wall looking at the viewer as if asking his or her involvement in his decision.

Style 
Leyster's choice to have this exchange take place at night with candlelight both adds an air of suspense and intrigue and showcases her mastery of and interest in lighting and shadows. While some scholars have argued that this emphasis on lighting brings to mind Leyster's potential influence from the Utrecht Caravaggisti others emphasize the painting's similarity in composition to her husband, Jan Miense Molenaer's early work Card Players by Lamplight. While both paintings employ similar lighting and idleness, the most convincing similarity is the mirrored image of Leyster's cavalier to the figure in Molenaer's foreground.

References

Paintings by Judith Leyster
1630 paintings